An ionomer (iono- + -mer) is a polymer composed of repeat units of both electrically neutral repeating units and ionized units covalently bonded to the polymer backbone as pendant group moieties.  Usually no more than 15 mole percent are ionized.  The ionized units are often carboxylic acid groups.

The classification of a polymer as an ionomer depends on the level of substitution of ionic groups as well as how the ionic groups are incorporated into the polymer structure. For example, polyelectrolytes also have ionic groups covalently bonded to the polymer backbone, but have a much higher ionic group molar substitution level (usually greater than 80%); ionenes are polymers where ionic groups are part of the actual polymer backbone. These two classes of ionic-group-containing polymers have vastly different morphological and physical properties and are therefore not considered ionomers. 

Ionomers have unique physical properties including electrical conductivity and viscosity—increase in ionomer solution viscosity with increasing temperatures (see conducting polymer). Ionomers also have unique morphological properties as the non-polar polymer backbone is energetically incompatible with the polar ionic groups. As a result, the ionic groups in most ionomers will undergo microphase separation to form ionic-rich domains.

Commercial applications for ionomers include golf ball covers, semipermeable membranes, sealing tape and thermoplastic elastomers.  Common examples of ionomers include polystyrene sulfonate, Nafion and Hycar.

Synthesis
Usually ionomer synthesis consists of two steps – the introduction of acid groups to the polymer backbone and the neutralization of some of the acid groups by a metal cation. In very rare cases, the groups introduced are already neutralized by a metal cation. The first step (introduction of acid groups) can be done in two ways; a neutral non-ionic monomer can be copolymerized with a monomer that contains pendant acid groups or acid groups can be added to a non-ionic polymer through post-reaction modifications. For example, ethylene-methacrylic acid and sulfonated perfluorocarbon (Nafion) are synthesized through copolymerization while polystyrene sulfonate is synthesized through post-reaction modifications.

In most cases, the acid form of the copolymer is synthesized (i.e. 100% of the carboxylic acid groups are neutralized by hydrogen cations) and the ionomer is formed through subsequent neutralization by the appropriate metal cation. The identity of the neutralizing metal cation has an effect on the physical properties of the ionomer; the most commonly used metal cations (at least in academic research) are zinc, sodium, and magnesium. Neutralization or ionomerization, can also be accomplished in two ways: the acid copolymer can be melt-mixed with a basic metal or neutralization can be achieved through solution processes. The former method is preferred commercially. However, as commercial manufacturers are reluctant to share their procedures, little is known about the exact conditions of the melt-mixing neutralization process other than that hydroxides are generally used to provide the metal cation. The latter solution neutralization process is generally used in academic settings. The acid copolymer is dissolved and a basic salt with the appropriate metal cation is added to this solution. Where dissolution of the acid copolymer is difficult, simply swelling the polymer in the solvent is sufficient, though dissolving is always preferred. Because basic salts are polar and are not soluble in the non-polar solvents used to dissolve most polymers, mixed solvents (e.g. 90:10 toluene/alcohol) are often used.

Neutralization level must be determined after an ionomer is synthesized as varying the neutralization level varies the morphological and physical properties of the ionomer. One method used to do this is to examine the peak heights of infrared vibrations of the acid form. However, there may be substantial error in determining peak height, especially since small amounts of water appear in the same wavenumber range. Titration of the acid groups is another method that can be used, though this is not possible in some systems.

Surlyn
Surlyn is the brand name of an ionomer resin created by DuPont, a copolymer of ethylene and methacrylic acid used as a coating and packaging material.
DuPont neutralizes the acid with NaOH, yielding the sodium salt.
Crystals of ethylene-methacrylic acid ionomers exhibit dual melting behavior.

Application 

By complexing metal ions into the polymer matrix, the strength and toughness of the ionomer system is increased. Some applications where ionomers were used to increase the toughness of the overall system include coatings, adhesives, impact modification, and thermoplastics, one of the most known examples being the use of Surlyn in the outer layer of golf balls. The ionomer coating improves the toughness, aerodynamics, and durability of the golf balls, increasing their lifetime. Ionomers can also be blended with resins to increase the cohesive strength without diminishing the overall tackiness of the resin, creating pressure sensitive adhesives for a variety of applications, including water or solvent-based adhesives. Ionomers using poly(ethylene-methacrylic acid) chains can also be used in film packaging due to their transparency, toughness, flexibility, resistance to staining, high gas permeability, and low sealing temperature. These qualities also translate to a high demand for using the ionomers in food-packing materials.

With the addition of the ion to a certain percentage of the polymer chain, the viscosity of the ionomer increases. This behavior can make ionomers a good viscosification material for drilling fluid applications where the system is under a low shear rate. Using the ionomer to increase the viscosity of the system helps prevent shear thinning behaviors within the drilling fluid, especially at higher temperatures of operation.

Another application includes the ability of an ionomer to increase the compatibility of polymer blends. This phenomenon is driven by thermodynamics and is achieved through the introduction of specific interactions between functional groups that are increasingly favorable in the presence of a metal ion. The miscibility can be driven not only by the increasingly favorable reaction between functional groups on two different polymers but also by having a strong repulsive interaction between the neutral and ionic species present within an ionomer, which can drive one of these species to be more miscible with the species of the other polymer within the blend. Some ionomers have been used for shape memory applications, meaning the material has a fixed shape that can be reformed using external stresses above a critical temperature and cooled, then regains the original shape when brought above the critical temperature and allowed to cool under no external stresses. Ionomers can form both chemical and physical crosslinks that can be modified easily at moderate processing temperatures, are less dense than shape memory alloys, and have a higher chance of being biocompatible for biomedical devices.

Some more recent applications for ionomers include being used as ion-selective membranes in a variety of electrical and energy applications. Examples include the cation exchange membrane for fuel cells, which allow only protons or specific ions to cross the membrane, a polymer electrolyte membrane (PEM) water electrolyzer to optimize the uniform coating of the catalyst on membrane surfaces, a redox flow battery separator, electrodialysis, where ions are transported between solutions using the ionomer membrane, and electrochemical hydrogen compressors to increase the strength of the membrane against the pressure differentials that can occur within the compressor.

See also
 Nafion

External links
 Ionomer primer with examples

References 

 Eisenberg, A. and Kim, J.-S., Introduction to Ionomers, New York: Wiley, 1998.
 
 
 Grady, Brian P. "Review and Critical Analysis of the Morphology of Random Ionomers Across Many Length Scales." Polymer Engineering and Science 48 (2008): 1029-051. Print.
 Spencer, M.W., M.D. Wetzel, C. Troeltzsch, and D.R. Paul. "Effects of Acid Neutralization on the Properties of K and Na Poly(ethylene-co-methacrylic Acid) Ionomers." Polymer 53 (2011): 569-80. Print.

Plastics
Polyelectrolytes
Copolymers
Salts
Thermoplastics